The following is a list of beetles of subfamily Paussinae of the family Carabidae of Nepal. Sixteen different species are listed.

This list is primarily based on Peter Nagel's 2018 "Flanged Bombardier Beetles of Nepal (Insecta: Coleoptera: Carabidae: Paussinae), with
nomenclatural and taxonomic notes and descriptions of new species".

Tribe Ozaenini

Eustra nageli
Dhanya bioculata
Itamus castaneus

Tribe Protopaussini
Protopaussus almorensis
Protopaussus vignai

Tribe Paussini

Subtribe Cerapterina
Cerapterus quadrimaculatus

Subtribe Platyrhopalina
Platyrhopalus denticornis
Platyrhopalus acutidens
Platyrhopalus paussoides

Subtribe Ceratoderina
Ceratoderus bifasciatus
Melanospilus chitwanensi

Subtribe Paussina
Paussus hardwickii 
Paussus (Scaphipaussus) tibialis
Paussus (Scaphipaussus) schiodtii
Paussus (Scaphipaussus) cardoni
Paussus (Paussus) yubaki

See also
List of butterflies of Nepal
List of moths of Nepal (Bombycidae)
List of moths of Nepal (Brahmaeidae)
List of moths of Nepal (Drepanidae)
List of moths of Nepal (Eupterotidae)
List of moths of Nepal (Lasiocampidae)
List of moths of Nepal (Limacodidae)
List of moths of Nepal (Saturniidae)
List of moths of Nepal (Sphingidae)
List of moths of Nepal (Uraniidae)
List of moths of Nepal (Zygaenidae)
List of beetles of Nepal (Cerambycidae)
List of beetles of Nepal (Coccinellidae)
List of bugs of Nepal (Scutelleridae)
List of Odonata of Nepal

References

beetles
Insects of Nepal
Nepal, Carabidae, Paussinae